Burial vault may refer to:

Burial vault (enclosure), protective coffin enclosure
Burial vault (tomb), underground tomb